Filley is an unincorporated community in Cedar County, in the U.S. state of Missouri.

History
A post office called Filley was established in 1882, and remained in operation until 1919. The community has the name of Chauncey Ives Filley, a state legislator.

References

Unincorporated communities in Cedar County, Missouri
Unincorporated communities in Missouri